Victor Buhler (born February 1, 1972) is an American television and film director.

Buhler was a Series Producer on The Vow and in 2019 he won a Sports Emmy for producing Tom vs. Time. He directed the documentary feature film Rikers High (2005), about the school for teenage inmates in Rikers Island jail.  It won the NY Loves Film Award for Best Documentary at the 2006 Tribeca Film Festival.  He also directed The Beautiful Game, a documentary feature film about the power of soccer in Africa that debuted at the Seattle International Film Festival in 2011.   Buhler also directed and produced A Whole Lott More, about employment for people with developmental disabilities.  It was named an audience favorite at the 2013 HotDocs Canadian International Documentary Festival. He also co-wrote and directed Running Naked.

Buhler’s directing TV credits include Sirens and Drugs Inc.    His short film Chaperone was nominated for a student Academy Award.

References

External links 

American documentary film directors
1972 births
Living people